Board of Intermediate and Secondary Education, Rawalpindi is a government agency whose main object is to conduct examinations of SSC and HSSC and declare their results. The Board is autonomous in nature.

The central forum is called Punjab Boards Committee of Chairmen (PBCC) and all the BISE's in Punjab take over the Chairmanship for one year in alphabetical order. Mr. Muhammad Adnan Khan is the current chairman of the Board.

The Board was established in October, 1977. Its offices have been located earlier on 6th road, Satellite Town, Rawalpindi but shifted into a newly constructed campus at Morgah near Attock Refinery Rawalpindi in March 2013.

Jurisdiction 
Jurisdiction of Rawalpindi Board includes Rawalpindi Division which includes following districts:
 Jhelum
 Attock
 Chakwal
 Murree
 Talagang

Examinations 
The board conducts the following examinations:
 SSC
 HSSC

Structure 

 Chairman is the Chief Executive
 Secretary is the sector head of Academics, Finance, Public Relations, Library, Stores, Legal Cell, Meeting, Physical Education, Transport, Facilitation Center and Establishment Branches
 Controller of Examinations is the sector head of Matric, Inter, Secrecy, Discipline, Information Technology and Record Branches
 Audit Officer as an independent branch

Examination results 

Board of Intermediate and Secondary Education Rawalpindi (BISE Rawalpindi) takes the first and second annual examinations each year and BISE Rawalpindi announces the annual examination results after completing a due course of formalities within three months after the conduct of examinations. The result is disseminated through an online result gazette, text messages (SMS), uploading on Board's official website, and providing printed result cards instantly at the time of result declaration.

Board of Governors 

The Board of Governors is composed of
 The Chairman
 The Vice Chancellor of the university or his nominee
 The Director of Education (Colleges) Rawalpindi
 Executive District Officers of Attock, Chakwal, Jhelum, and Rawalpindi
 Representative from Finance and Education Departments
 Two Headmasters and one Headmistress of schools
 One Principal in each of the Degree and Intermediate colleges
 Two persons from amongst scholars and retired educationists

Intermediate and Secondary Education Boards in Pakistan 
Islamabad

Punjab

Sindh

Khyber Pakhtunkhwa

Balochistan

Azad Jammu and Kashmir

References

External links 
 Official Website of Rawalpindi Board

Rawalpindi